The national badminton team of Thailand represents Thailand in international Badminton competitions. It is managed by the Badminton Association of Thailand (BAT).

The team took a semifinalist in the 2013, 2017 and 2019 Sudirman Cup, the best finish by any team outside the biggest Badminton country, Indonesia, South Korea, China and Denmark. Also, the team took a second-place finish in 1961 Thomas Cup by men's team and the women's team also took a second-place finish in 2018 Uber Cup.

Competitive record

Sudirman Cup

Thomas Cup

Uber Cup

Participation in Asia Championships 

Men's team

Women's team

Mixed team

Participation in Southeast Asian Games

Players

Current squad

Thomas Cup

Uber Cup

Previous squads 
Sudirman Cup squads: 2015, 2017, 2019, 2021
Thomas Cup squads: 2008, 2014, 2016, 2018, 2020, 2022
Uber Cup squads: 2012, 2014, 2016, 2018, 2020, 2022

References

Badminton
National badminton teams
Badminton in Thailand